The WAGR C class was a class of light axle load steam locomotives operated by the Western Australian Government Railways (WAGR) between 1902 and 1961. A total of 22 were built in two batches.

History
The first batch of 12 engines was built by Baldwin Locomotive Works, Philadelphia in 1902. This batch was originally of a 4-6-0 wheel arrangement, and was a lighter version of the Ec class, gaining them the Baby Yanks nickname. Between 1908 and 1918 these were fitted with larger, improved boilers and converted to a 4-6-2 configuration. A second batch of 10 engines was built by the WAGR's Midland Railway Workshops in 1915, to the modified 4-6-2 design.

They entered service on mixed passenger and mail services on the Eastern, Eastern Goldfields and Great Southern lines. They later operated on the Northern and South Western lines.

Seventeen members of the class were later fitted with superheaters and reclassified as the Cs class with the first completed in June 1929. In the 1940s, five received new frames. Four of these, Cs270 Black Butt, Cs432 Marri, Cs439 Banksia and Cs440 Jarrah were transferred to the Railway Department Sawmill at Banksiadale in the early 1950s and named. All were included in the sale of the timber mill to Hawker Siddeley Building Supplies in October 1961. After being replaced by road transport, all were scrapped at Subiaco in June 1964.

Namesakes
The C class designation was previously used for the C class locomotives that were withdrawn in 1902. It was reused in the 1960s when the C class diesel locomotives entered service.

See also

Rail transport in Western Australia
List of Western Australian locomotive classes

References

Notes

Cited works

External links

Baldwin locomotives
Railway locomotives introduced in 1902
C WAGR class (1902)
3 ft 6 in gauge locomotives of Australia
4-6-0 locomotives
4-6-2 locomotives
Scrapped locomotives